Changsha Medical University/College (CSMU) is the first private medical undergraduate institution in China, located in Changsha, Hunan Province, China.

Changsha Medical University/College, China's governmental medical university for undergraduates, was founded by the famous educator Binsheng He in 1989. It is situated in Changsha, capital of Hunan Province and was upgraded to a medical university for undergraduates in 2005 by the Ministry of Education. CSMU is under the jurisdiction of Hunan People's Government and the professional guidance of the Department of Public Health of the government. 

Changsha Medical University is listed in WHO's World Directory of Medical Schools and is welcoming students from all over the world.

As of 2022, Changsha Medical University ranked the best private university in Hunan and 17th nationwide in the recent edition of the recognized Best Chinese Universities Ranking.

References

External links
 www.csmu.edu.cn Official web site
 Changsha Medical University's English Web Page

1989 establishments in China
Educational institutions established in 1989
Medical schools in China
Universities and colleges in Changsha
Universities and colleges in Hunan
Yuelu District